A list of French-produced films scheduled for release in 2020.

Films

Notes

External links
 French films of 2020 at the Internet Movie Database

French
2020
Films